Linos-Spyridon Chrysikopoulos (Greek: Λίνος-Σπυρίδων Χρυσικόπουλος; born December 1, 1992) is a Greek professional basketball player for Kolossos Rodou of the Greek Basket League. He is 6'8" (2.03 m) tall and 225 lb. (102 kg). He plays mainly at the power forward position. His nickname is Spider-Man.

Professional career
Born in Corfu, Greece, Chrysikopoulos began his professional career during the 2008–09 season, with the Greek League club Aris Thessaloniki, and stayed there for three seasons. On July 13, 2011, he moved to the Italian League club Biella. He was released by Biella in January 2013.

After leaving Biella, he joined the Greek League club PAOK. He then moved the Greek club KAOD. He signed with Nea Kifissia on August 16, 2015.

He returned to PAOK in 2016. On August 24, 2019, Chrysikopoulos signed a three-year deal with AEK Athens. 

On August 9, 2021, Chrysikopoulos signed with Peristeri. On April 18, 2022, he was suspended for the rest of the season, along with teammate Dimitris Katsivelis, after they both fell out of favor with the club's new head coach Milan Tomić. In 16 league games, he averaged 7.2 points, 2.2 rebounds and 1.2 assists per contest.

On August 18, 2022, Chrysikopoulos moved south to Kolossos Rodou.

National team career
Chrysikopoulos was a member of the Greek junior national teams. He played at the 2008 FIBA Europe Under-16 Championship, the 2009 FIBA Europe Under-18 Championship, the 2010 FIBA Europe Under-18 Championship, and the 2011 FIBA Europe Under-20 Championship.

He has also been a member of the senior men's Greek national basketball team. He played at the 2019 FIBA World Cup qualification, as well as the 2020 Olympic Qualifying Tournament, in Victoria, Canada, under coach Rick Pitino.

Player profile
Chrysikopoulos was originally listed as 6'10" in height in shoes, with a 7'1" wingspan. He can defend multiple positions and run a team's offense if necessary, being utilized as a point forward.

Career statistics

FIBA Champions League

|-
| style="text-align:left;" | 2016–17
| style="text-align:left;" | PAOK
| 18 || 20.9  || .488 || .261 || .594 || 4.7 || 1.7 || .4 || .4 || 8.1
|-
| style="text-align:left;" | 2017–18
| style="text-align:left;" | PAOK
| 14 || 18.0  || .409 || .341 || .727 || 2.9 || .8 || .4 || .6 || 6.7
|-
| style="text-align:left;" | 2018–19
| style="text-align:left;" | PAOK
| 16 || 23.1  || .574 || .459 || .595 || 2.9 || 1.3 || .9 || .5 || 10.7
|}

Regular season

|-
| 2013–14
| style="text-align:left;"| KAOD
| align=center | GBL
| 5  || 18.0 || .556 || .417 || - || 3.2 || .4 || .4 || .2 || 7.0
|-
| 2014–15
| style="text-align:left;"| KAOD
| align=center | GBL
| 13  || 16.4 || .362 || .241 || .700 || 2.5 || 1.3 || .9 || .3 || 4.9
|-
| 2015–16
| style="text-align:left;"| Kifissia
| align=center | GBL
| 22  || 10.2 || .491 || .294 || .727 || 1.3 || .6 || .4 || .3 || 3.4
|-
| 2016–17
| style="text-align:left;"| PAOK
| align=center | GBL
| 26 || 19.5 || .551 || .333 || .698 || 4.3 || .9 || .7 || .6 || 8.4
|-
| 2017–18
| style="text-align:left;"| PAOK
| align=center | GBL
| 25 || 17.1 || .504 || .339 || .667 || 3.0 || .8 || .3 || .3 || 6.8
|-
| 2018–19
| style="text-align:left;"| PAOK
| align=center | GBL
| 26 || 21.0 || .469 || .316 || .788 || 3.1 || 1.3 || .9 || .5 || 8.9
|}

References

External links
Twitter
Instagram
Euroleague.net profile
FIBA profile
FIBA Europe profile
Eurobasket.com profile
Greek Basket League profile 
Greek Basket League profile 
Italian League profile 
Draftexpress.com profile
NBADraft.net profile

1992 births
Living people
AEK B.C. players
Aris B.C. players
Greek Basket League players
Greek men's basketball players
K.A.O.D. B.C. players
Kolossos Rodou B.C. players
Nea Kifissia B.C. players
Pallacanestro Biella players
P.A.O.K. BC players
Peristeri B.C. players
Power forwards (basketball)
Sportspeople from Corfu